Rini Wulandari (born 28 April 1990) or famous by her stage name, Rinni Wulandari is an Indonesian R&B singer. On 28 July 2007, she won the fourth season of the reality television Indonesian Idol, making her the second female winner. At 17, she is the first youngest winner in Indonesian Idol history.

Biography

Early life
Rini Wulandari was born to R.Soetrisno and Sri Hartati Mardiningish. She is the youngest of four children. She came from a family of musicians. Her mother was a former lead singer of Quintana Band and her father was a bassist when he was young. Rini became the lead singer of Quintana, following in the footsteps of her mother. Rini graduated from SMA Negeri 1 Medan in 2008.

Indonesian Idol
Rini auditioned for Idol in her hometown of Medan on the second day auditions. On 5 May 2007, Rini made it into the top twelve of Indonesian Idol or also known Spectacular rounds. In the first spectacular round, she sang Warna's "50 Tahun Lagi". During the top 6 performances which was Percussion Night week, Rini sang a rendition of Gloria Estefan's "Conga" which garnered her a top 5 position. Other songs Rini performed on Indonesian Idol include Christina Aguilera's "Reflection", Mariah Carey's "Emotions", and Celine Dion's "Because You Loved Me". Rini made it to the finale and won the title over Wilson with 51.2% of the audience vote.

List of Indonesian Idol performances
Original audition: "Cintai Aku Lagi" by Sania

After Idol
Rinni Wulandari has released 4 albums, ‘Aku Tetap Milikmu’(2007)‘Independent Part 1’(2015) ‘Independent Part 2’(2017) and her latest album SKINS (2021).

Rinni has another duo project “SOUNDWAVE” along with her husband, Jevin Julian. They met on the Producer/Remixer Competition on Net TV back in 2015. Since then, they decided to keep making music as a duo until now.

Through her career, Rinni Wulandari has been nominated in several music awards, such as AMI Awards, Anugrah Planet Muzik Singapore, and Indonesian Choice Awards. In 2020 she won AMI Awards for the first time as The Best R&B Singer. She also performed at Music Matters Singapore in 2015. Rinni was performed for the opening ceremony ASEAN GAMES in 2018. And she collaborated with other South East Asian artists for a charity single ‘Heal’ for COVID-19 in August 2020.

List of Asian Idol : Choice of Indonesia performances

Graduate
In 2012, she is one of the small list of Indonesian artists with bachelor's degrees which graduated from Paramadina University, Jakarta majored in communications. "I'm relieved. I can concentrate more on my singing career now.

Discography

Albums
 2007: Indonesian Idol: Masterpiece (Compilation)
 2007: Aku Tetap Milikmu
 2010: Idola Terdahsyat (Compilation)
 2015 Independent Part 1
2017 Independet Part 2
2021 SKINS

References

Living people
1990 births
Indonesian child singers
21st-century Indonesian women singers
Indonesian actresses
Indonesian Idol winners
Indonesian pop singers
Indonesian rhythm and blues singers
People from Medan